The 7th Blockbuster Entertainment Awards were held on April 10, 2001 at the Shrine Auditorium in Los Angeles. This was the final Blockbuster Entertainment Awards ceremony. Below is a complete list of nominees and winners. Winners are highlighted in bold.

Film

Favorite Actor - Drama
 Mel Gibson, The Patriot
 George Clooney, The Perfect Storm
 Tom Hanks, Cast Away
 Denzel Washington, Remember the Titans
 Michael Douglas, Traffic

Favorite Actor - Drama/Romance
 Ben Affleck, Bounce
 Kevin Spacey, Pay it Forward
 Will Smith, The Legend of Bagger Vance
 Billy Crudup, Almost Famous
 Matt Damon, All the Pretty Horses

Favorite Actor - Comedy/Romance
 Nicolas Cage, The Family Man
 Jim Carrey, Me, Myself & Irene
 Robert de Niro, Meet the Parents
 Ben Stiller, Meet the Parents
 Mel Gibson, What Women Want

Favorite Actor - Comedy
 Jim Carrey, How the Grinch Stole Christmas
 Martin Lawrence, Big Momma's House
 Eddie Murphy, Nutty Professor II: The Klumps
 Marlon Wayans, Scary Movie
 Shawn Wayans, Scary Movie

Favorite Actor - Horror
 David Arquette, Scream 3
 Devon Sawa, Final Destination
 Vin Diesel, Pitch Black

Favorite Actor - Action
 Russell Crowe, Gladiator
 Nicolas Cage, Gone in Sixty Seconds
 Tom Cruise, Mission: Impossible 2
 Samuel L. Jackson, Shaft
 Matthew McConaughey, U-571

Favorite Actor - Suspense
 Harrison Ford, What Lies Beneath
 Dennis Quaid, Frequency
 Russell Crowe, Proof of Life
 Samuel L. Jackson, Unbreakable
 Bruce Willis, Unbreakable

Favorite Actor - Science Fiction
 Kevin Bacon, Hollow Man
 Patrick Stewart, X-Men
 Vince Vaughn, The Cell

Favorite Actress - Drama
 Julia Roberts, Erin Brockovich
 Joan Allen, The Contender
 Kate Winslet, Quills

Favorite Actress - Drama/Romance
 Gwyneth Paltrow, Bounce
 Penélope Cruz, All the Pretty Horses
 Charlize Theron, The Legend of Bagger Vance
 Helen Hunt, Pay It Forward

Favorite Actress - Comedy/Romance
 Helen Hunt, What Women Want
 Téa Leoni, The Family Man
 Jenna Elfman, Keeping the Faith
 Renée Zellweger, Me, Myself & Irene

Favorite Actress - Comedy
 Sandra Bullock, Miss Congeniality
 Kirsten Dunst, Bring It On
 Janet Jackson, Nutty Professor II: The Klumps
 Nia Long, Big Momma's House

Favorite Actress - Horror
 Neve Campbell, Scream 3
 Ali Larter, Final Destination
 Courteney Cox, Scream 3

Favorite Actress - Suspense
 Michelle Pfeiffer, What Lies Beneath
 Kim Basinger, Bless the Child
 Meg Ryan, Proof of Life

Favorite Actress - Science Fiction
 Jennifer Lopez, The Cell
 Anna Paquin, X-Men
 Elisabeth Shue, Hollow Man

Favorite Actress - Action
 Angelina Jolie, Gone in Sixty Seconds
 Robin Tunney, Vertical Limit
 Vanessa Williams, Shaft

Favorite Supporting Actor - Comedy/Romance
 Jack Black, High Fidelity
 Michael Bowman, Me, Myself & Irene
 Don Cheadle, The Family Man
 Michael Clarke Duncan, The Whole Nine Yards
 Mark Feuerstein, What Women Want

Favorite Supporting Actor - Drama/Romance
 Haley Joel Osment, Pay It Forward
 Philip Seymour Hoffman, Almost Famous
 Jason Lee, Almost Famous

Favorite Supporting Actor - Action
 Bill Murray, Charlie's Angels
 Djimon Hounsou, Gladiator
 Harvey Keitel, U-571

Favorite Supporting Actor - Suspense
 Andre Braugher, Frequency
 David Caruso, Proof of Life
 Spencer Treat Clark, Unbreakable

Favorite Supporting Actor - Drama
 Benicio Del Toro, Traffic
 Albert Finney, Erin Brockovich
 Wood Harris, Remember the Titans
 Mark Wahlberg, The Perfect Storm

Favorite Supporting Actor - Science Fiction
 James Marsden, X-Men
 Vincent D'Onofrio, The Cell
 Josh Brolin, Hollow Man

Favorite Supporting Actor - Comedy
 Benjamin Bratt, Miss Congeniality
 Paul Giamatti, Big Momma's House
 Tom Green, Road Trip
 Jeffrey Tambor, How the Grinch Stole Christmas
 Owen Wilson, Meet the Parents

Favorite Supporting Actress - Comedy/Romance
 Maria Bello, Coyote Ugly
 Amanda Peet, The Whole Nine Yards
 Marisa Tomei, What Women Want

Favorite Supporting Actress - Suspense
 Christina Ricci, Bless the Child
 Pamela Reed, Proof of Life
 Robin Wright, Unbreakable
 Diana Scarwid, What Lies Beneath

Favorite Supporting Actress - Science Fiction
 Rebecca Romijn, X-Men
 Kim Dickens, Hollow Man
 Famke Janssen, X-Men

Favorite Supporting Actress - Drama/Romance
 Frances McDormand, Almost Famous
 Fairuza Balk, Almost Famous
 Caroline Aaron, Bounce

Favorite Supporting Actress - Comedy
 Cheri Oteri, Scary Movie
 Christine Baranski, How the Grinch Stole Christmas
 Molly Shannon, How the Grinch Stole Christmas
 Blythe Danner, Meet the Parents
 Candice Bergen, Miss Congeniality

Favorite Supporting Actress - Drama
 Helen Hunt, Cast Away
 Marg Helgenberger, Erin Brockovich
 Diane Lane, The Perfect Storm
 Catherine Zeta-Jones, Traffic

Favorite Supporting Actress - Action
 Lucy Liu, Shanghai Noon
 Connie Nielsen, Gladiator
 Toni Collette, Shaft

Favorite Action Team
 Drew Barrymore, Cameron Diaz, Lucy Liu, Charlie's Angels
 Jackie Chan, Owen Wilson, Shanghai Noon
 Clint Eastwood, James Garner, Tommy Lee Jones, Donald Sutherland, Space Cowboys
 Yun-Fat Chow, Michelle Yeoh, Crouching Tiger, Hidden Dragon

Favorite Male - Newcomer
 Heath Ledger, The Patriot
 Patrick Fugit, Almost Famous
 Jim Caviezel, Frequency
 Hugh Jackman, X-Men

Favorite Female - Newcomer
 Kate Hudson, Almost Famous
 Taylor Momsen, How the Grinch Stole Christmas
 Thandie Newton, Mission: Impossible 2
 Piper Perabo, Coyote Ugly
 Teri Polo, Meet the Parents

Favorite Villain
 Joaquin Phoenix, Gladiator
 Dougray Scott, Mission: Impossible 2
 Jason Isaacs, The Patriot
 Ian McKellen, X-Men

Favorite Family Film
 Chicken Run
 Dinosaur
 Rugrats in Paris: The Movie
 The Emperor's New Groove

World Artist Award
 Warren Beatty

Music

Favorite Female Artist of the Year
 Christina Aguilera, Christina Aguilera 
 Toni Braxton, The Heat
 Faith Hill, Breathe
 Madonna, Music
 Britney Spears, Oops!... I Did It Again

Favorite Male Artist of the Year
 Eminem, The Marshall Mathers LP
 Dr. Dre, Dr. Dre 2001
 Ricky Martin, Sound Loaded
 Kid Rock, The History of Rock
 Sting, Brand New Day

Favorite Group of the Year
 Destiny's Child, The Writing's on the Wall
 Backstreet Boys, Black & Blue
 Creed, Human Clay
 'NSYNC, No Strings Attached
 Santana, Supernatural

Favorite Artist — Rap
 Eminem, The Marshall Mathers LP
 DMX, ... And Then There Was X
 Dr. Dre, Dr. Dre 2001
 Jay-Z, The Dynasty: Roc La Familia
 Outkast, Stankonia

Favorite Female Artist — Country
 Faith Hill, Breathe
 Reba McEntire, So Good Together
 Jo Dee Messina, Burn
 Lee Ann Womack, I Hope You Dance

Favorite Male Artist — Country
 Tim McGraw, Greatest Hits
 Kenny Chesney, Greatest Hits
 Toby Keith, How Do You Like Me Now
 George Strait, Latest Greatest Straitest Hits

Favorite Duo or Group — Country
 Dixie Chicks, Fly
 Lonestar, Lonely Grill
 SheDaisy, The Whole SHeBANG

Favorite Female Artist — R&B
 Toni Braxton, Heat
 Whitney Houston, Whitney: The Greatest Hits
 Sade, Lovers Rock

Favorite Male Artist — R&B
 Joe, My Name Is Joe
 D'Angelo, Voodoo
 R. Kelly, TP-2.com

Favorite Group — R&B
 Destiny's Child, The Writing's on the Wall
 Jagged Edge, J.E. Heartbreak
 Next, Welcome II Nextasy

Favorite Artist — Rock
 Lenny Kravitz, Greatest Hits
 Don Henley, Inside Job
 Kid Rock, The History of Rock
 Sting, Brand New Day

Favorite Group — Rock
 Limp Bizkit, Chocolate Starfish and the Hot Dog Flavored Water
 Bon Jovi, Crush
 Creed, Human Clay
 Red Hot Chili Peppers, Californication
 Santana, Supernatural

Favorite Female — New Artist
 Pink, Can't Take Me Home
 Dido, No Angel
 Macy Gray, On How Life Is
 Mandy Moore, So Real and I Wanna Be With You
 Jessica Simpson, Sweet Kisses

Favorite Male — New Artist
 Nelly, Country Grammar
 Billy Gilman, One Voice
 Sisqó, Unleash the Dragon

Favorite Group — New Artist
 3 Doors Down, The Better Life
 Baha Men, Who Let the Dogs Out
 Papa Roach, Infest

Favorite CD
 'NSYNC, No Strings Attached
 Creed, Human Clay
 Eminem, The Marshall Mathers LP
 Santana, Supernatural
 Britney Spears, Oops! ... I Did It Again

Favorite Artist — Latino
 Christina Aguilera, Mi Reflejo
 Marc Anthony, Desde un Principio: From the Beginning
 Gloria Estefan, Alma Caribeña
 Ricky Martin, Sound Loaded
 Shakira, MTV Unplugged

Favorite Group — Latino
 Son by Four, Son by Four
 A.B. Quintanilla y Los Kumbia Kings, Amor, Familia y Respeto
 Los Temerarios, En La Madrugada Se Fue

Favorite Single
 NSYNC, "Bye Bye Bye"
 Creed, "Higher"
 Destiny's Child, "Say My Name"
 Faith Hill, "Breathe"
 Madonna, "Music"

Favorite Soundtrack
 Charlie's Angels
 Coyote Ugly
 Mission: Impossible 2
 Nutty Professor II: The Klumps
 Romeo Must Die

Favorite Song From a Movie
 LeAnn Rimes, "Can't Fight the Moonlight" (Coyote Ugly)
 Destiny's Child, "Independent Woman Part 1" (Charlie's Angels)
 Janet Jackson, "Doesn't Really Matter" (Nutty Professor II: The Klumps)
 Marc Anthony, "You Sang to Me" (Runaway Bride)
 Hoku, "Another Dumb Blonde" (Snow Day)

Favorite Female Artist — Pop
 Britney Spears, Oops! ... I Did It Again
 Christina Aguilera, Christina Aguilera
 Celine Dion, All the Way... A Decade of Song
 Faith Hill, Breathe
 Madonna, Music

Favorite Male Artist — Pop
 Ricky Martin, Sound Loaded
 Marc Anthony, Marc Anthony
 Enrique Iglesias, Enrique
 Lenny Kravitz, Greatest Hits
 Sting, Brand New Day

Favorite Group — Pop
 'NSYNC, No Strings Attached
 98 Degrees, Revelation
 Backstreet Boys, Black & Blue
 Destiny's Child, The Writing's on the Wall
 Savage Garden, Affirmation

Video games

Favorite Video Game
 Driver 2: The Wheelman Is Back

Favorite PlayStation Game
 Tony Hawk's Pro Skater 2

Favorite PlayStation 2 Game
 Madden NFL 2001

Favorite N64 Game
 Mario Party 2

Favorite Dreamcast Game
 Tony Hawk's Pro Skater 2

Favorite Game Boy Game
 Tony Hawk's Pro Skater 2

References

2001 awards in the United States
2001 film awards
2001 music awards
2001 in California
Blockbuster LLC